Aethaloessa floridalis is a moth of the family Crambidae described by Philipp Christoph Zeller in 1852. It is found throughout of subtropical Africa, including islands of the Indian Ocean and South and South-East Asia.

References

External links
 "Aethaloessa floridalis (Zeller, 1852)". Lepidoptera of French Polynesia. by Peter Oboyski.

Spilomelinae
Moths described in 1852
Moths of Africa
Moths of Madagascar
Moths of Asia